Alan Thicke (born Alan Willis Jeffrey; March 1, 1947December 13, 2016) was a Canadian actor, songwriter, and game and talk show host. He is the father of American singer Robin Thicke. In 2013, Thicke was inducted into Canada's Walk of Fame. Thicke was best known for playing Dr. Jason Seaver on the 1980s sitcom Growing Pains on ABC.

Early life
Thicke was born in Kirkland Lake, Ontario, the son of Shirley "Joan" Isobel Marie (née Greer), a nurse, and William Jeffrey, a stockbroker. They divorced in 1953. His mother remarried Brian Thicke, a physician, and they moved to Elliot Lake. Alan Thicke graduated from Elliot Lake Secondary School in 1965 and was elected homecoming king. He went on to attend the University of Western Ontario joining the Delta Upsilon fraternity.

Career

Hosting

Game shows
Thicke hosted the Canadian game show "Face The Music" for CHCH-TV by Niagara Television in 1975, which would not be related in any way to the Sandy Frank Productions produced version in 1980-81, then a Canadian game show on CFCF-TV in Montreal called First Impressions in the late 1970s and the Saturday morning celebrity game show Animal Crack-Ups in the late 1980s. In 1997, he hosted a television version of the board game Pictionary.  In the early 2000s, he hosted the All New 3's a Crowd on the Game Show Network.

Talk shows
Norman Lear hired Thicke to produce and head the writing staff of Fernwood 2 Night, a tongue-in-cheek talk show based on characters from Lear's earlier show, Mary Hartman, Mary Hartman. In the late 1970s, he was a frequent guest host of The Alan Hamel Show, a popular daytime talk show on Canadian TV, usually hosted by Alan Hamel. When the Hamel series ended in the early 1980s, it was replaced by The Alan Thicke Show. The show at one point spawned a prime-time spinoff, Prime Cuts, which consisted of edited highlights from the talk show. Thicke was later signed to do an American syndicated late-night talk show, Thicke of the Night. Heavily promoted prior to broadcast as a competitor to NBC's The Tonight Show Starring Johnny Carson, Thicke of the Night was short-lived.

Other hosting
During 2014 and 2015 Thicke hosted a travelling dance show Dancing Pros Live which toured the United States.

Producing and composing
Thicke had a successful career as a TV theme song composer, often collaborating with his then-wife Gloria Loring on these projects, which included the themes to the popular sitcoms Diff'rent Strokes and The Facts of Life. He also wrote a number of TV game show themes, including The Wizard of Odds (for which he also sang the vocal introduction), The Joker's Wild, Celebrity Sweepstakes, The Diamond Head Game, Animal Crack-Ups (which he co-wrote with his brother Todd Thicke and Gary Pickus), Blank Check, Stumpers!, Whew!, and the original theme to Wheel of Fortune. Thicke was a popular songwriter. He co-wrote "Sara", a solo hit for Bill Champlin and included on the latter's Runaway album (1981).

Thicke produced a variety of television shows, including Anne Murray Christmas specials for the CBC, beginning in the late 1970s.

Growing Pains
Thicke played Jason Seaver, a psychiatrist and father, on the family sitcom Growing Pains. When the show began, Jason was moving his psychiatry practice into the home to be closer to the family's children while the family matriarch Maggie, played by Joanna Kerns, resumed her career as a reporter. Growing Pains debuted on ABC in 1985 and ran until 1992.

Thicke reprised his role in two reunion TV movies, The Growing Pains Movie (2000) and Growing Pains: Return of the Seavers (2004).

Television and film appearances

Thicke co-hosted the Walt Disney World Very Merry Christmas Parade (now the Disney Parks Christmas Day Parade) with Joan Lunden from 1983 to 1990, when he was succeeded by Regis Philbin. Thicke also hosted the Crystal Light National Aerobic Championship from 1987 to 1988.

In 1987, Thicke appeared as Dr. Jonas Carson, who creates an android that looks just like a human teenage boy (played by Jay Underwood), and he "adopts" him as his son in the Disney Channel film Not Quite Human. Thicke would reprise his role as Jonas Carson in two sequels, 1989's Not Quite Human II and 1992's Still Not Quite Human.

In 1988, he hosted the Miss USA Pageant in El Paso, Texas, replacing Bob Barker (who quit over fur being involved in the pageants). He replaced Barker again as host of the 1988 Miss Universe Pageant (along with Tracy Scoggins) in Taipei, Taiwan. Thicke was replaced by Dick Clark as host of the 1989 Miss USA Pageant in Mobile, Alabama and by John Forsythe as host of the 1989 Miss Universe Pageant in Cancún, Mexico.

Thicke continued to host a wide range of variety TV events. In 1989, he co-hosted with SCTV alumna Andrea Martin the TV special Opening of SkyDome in Toronto, which aired across Canada on the CBC. In 2004, he hosted the Miss Universe Canada Pageant in Ontario.

In 1992, Thicke appeared as himself in the pilot episode of the sitcom Hangin' with Mr. Cooper. He appeared in the end-credits scene, alongside series star Mark Curry, humorously referencing the pilot episode being filmed on the same set used as the Seavers' home on Growing Pains.

Thicke appeared on the American television series Hope & Gloria, which ran for 35 episodes. In April 2006, he hosted Celebrity Cooking Showdown on NBC, in which celebrities were teamed with famous chefs in a cooking competition. In 2006 he made an appearance in La La Land as himself. In August 2006 and 2007, Thicke made a few appearances as talk show host Rich Ginger on The Bold and the Beautiful. Thicke also makes a cameo appearance in the 2007 movie Alpha Dog as the father of the lead character's girlfriend.

In 2008, Thicke appeared in a major supporting role as Jim Jarlewski in the television series adaptation of Douglas Coupland's jPod. That same year, he had a cameo appearance in the How I Met Your Mother episode "Sandcastles in the Sand" as the dad in Robin Scherbatsky's second "Robin Sparkles" music video. He guest starred as himself in the episodes "The Rough Patch", "Glitter", "P.S. I Love You", and "The Rehearsal Dinner".

In February 2009, Thicke made a guest appearance on Adult Swim's Tim and Eric Awesome Show, Great Job. In the same month, he made a guest appearance on the web series Star-ving. He also had a role in the 2009 film, The Goods: Live Hard, Sell Hard. On July 10, 2009, Thicke appeared on the 1000th episode of Attack of the Show!, and he sang a song with Kevin Pereira and Olivia Munn.

Thicke appeared in the season six finale of Just Shoot Me, "The Boys in the Band." He made a guest appearance on a few episodes of Canada's Worst Handyman 5. In 2010, Thicke appeared on the television program, Tosh.0. In October 2010, he appeared as a celebrity contestant on Don't Forget the Lyrics, where he played for the charities ProCon.org and the Alan Thicke Center for diabetes research.

In March 2013, he participated on ABC's Celebrity Wife Swap. He swapped wives with comedian Gilbert Gottfried.

In October 2016, Thicke appeared as himself in the pilot episode of NBC's This is Us.

Commercials
In the 1990s, Thicke was the spokesman for the Canadian division of Woolco department stores until its demise in 1994. In 2007, Thicke appeared in a television ad for Tahiti Village, a Las Vegas time-share resort. In 2009, Thicke began appearing in TV ads endorsing CCS Medical, a distributor of home-delivered diabetes supplies. In 2014, Thicke began appearing in ad spots for Optima Tax Relief.

From 2011, Thicke was the spokesperson for Cambridge Life Solutions, a Canadian company that promised to reduce unsecured consumer debt through a method known as debt settlement, which had been outlawed in the United States by the Federal Trade Commission as a predatory practice in 2010 and was subsequently banned in Ontario in 2015. According to Scott Hannah, the president and CEO of the Credit Counseling Society of Canada, the company, which was accused of "bilking thousands of vulnerable Canadians" grew to dominate half of the Canadian market due to Thicke being hired "as a spokesman who was very credible to Canadians."

Philanthropy
As noted, Thicke lent his name and star power to supporting the Alan Thicke Center for diabetes research. Also, for several years in the mid-1980s, Thicke and Gloria Loring were co-hosts of Telemiracle, an annual 20-hour telethon that alternated between Saskatoon and Regina, Saskatchewan, to support programs run by the Kinsmen Club.

Personal life 
Thicke was married three times: His first marriage, to Days of Our Lives actress Gloria Loring, lasted from 1970 until 1984; they had two sons, Brennan and Robin. In 1987 at the age of 40, Thicke began dating 17-year old Kristy Swanson. Two years later, they were engaged but never married. He married his second wife, Miss World 1990 Gina Tolleson, on August 13, 1994, and had a son, Carter William Thicke, before their divorce was finalized on September 29, 1999. In 1999, he met Tanya Callau in Miami, where he was a celebrity host and she was a model. They were married from 2005 until his death.

Death
On December 13, 2016, Thicke collapsed while playing ice hockey with his son Carter at Pickwick Gardens in Burbank, California. The manager of the rink said he was talking and even joked to his son to take a photo as he was being wheeled out on a stretcher.  Thicke died later that day of type-A aortic dissection at the Providence Saint Joseph Medical Center in Burbank, at the age of 69. On December 19, 2016, the cast of Growing Pains, including Leonardo DiCaprio, reunited at Thicke's funeral; a eulogy was given by his friend Bob Saget, and his son, Robin, offered a humorous remembrance. He was buried at Santa Barbara Cemetery in Santa Barbara, California.

Filmography

Film
{| class="wikitable sortable"
|- style="text-align:center;"
! Year
! Title
! Role
! Notes
|-
| 1971
| The Point!
| Narrator / Father
| Voice, third telecast
|-
| 1987
| Not Quite Human (film)
| Dr. Jonas Carson
|
|-
| 1989
| Not Quite Human II
| Dr. Jonas Carson
|
|-
| 1991
| And You Thought Your Parents Were Weird
| Matthew Carson / Newman
| Voice
|-
| 1992
| Still Not Quite Human
| Dr. Jonas Carson / Bonus
|
|-
| rowspan="2"|1993
| Stepmonster
| George Dougherty
|
|-
| Betrayal of the Dove
| Jack West
|
|-
| 1995
| Open Season
| Xanex
|
|-
| 1996
| Demolition High
| Slater
|
|-
| rowspan="2"|1998
| Anarchy TV
| Reverend Wright
|
|-
| Casper Meets Wendy
| Baseball Announcer
|
|-
| rowspan="2"|2000
| Bear with Me
| Ken Robinson
|
|-
| Ice Angel
| Coach Parker
|-
|rowspan="2"|2001
| Xin shi zi jie tou (X-Roads)
| Steve
|
|-
| Teddy Bears' Picnic
| Alan Thicke
|
|-
|rowspan="2"|2003
| Carolina
| Chuck McBride – Perfect Date Host
|
|-
| Hollywood North
| Peter Casey
|
|-
|rowspan="2"|2004
| Raising Helen
| Hockey Cantor
|
|-
| Childstar
| J.R.
|
|-
|rowspan="2"|2006
| Alpha Dog
| Douglas Holden
|
|-
| The Surfer King
| Pipeman
|
|-
|rowspan="2"|2009
| The Goods: Live Hard, Sell Hard
| Stu Harding
|
|-
| RoboDoc
| Dr. Roskin
|
|-
|rowspan="2"|2012
| That's My Boy
| TV Version Donny's Dad
|
|-
| Hemingway
| Paul Hemmingway
|
|-
| 2013
| Cubicle Warriors
| Peter Hoss
|
|-
| 2015
| Being Canadian
| Himself
| Documentary
|-
|rowspan="3"|2017
| It's Not My Fault and I Don't Care Anyway| Patrick Spencer
| Posthumous release
|-
| The Clapper| Himself
| Posthumous release
|-
| Love's Last Resort| Paul Roberts
| Posthumous release (final film role)
|}

 Television 

Series

 Television movies 

 Books 
 
 

Honours
1988: Nominated – Golden Globe Award for Best Performance by an Actor in a TV-Series – Comedy/Musical for Growing Pains1998: Nominated – Daytime Emmy Award for Outstanding Audience Participation Show/Game Show for Pictionary'' (co-executive producer)
2013: Inducted into Canada's Walk of Fame
2015: Brampton Arts Walk of Fame
2016: Canadian Icon award, Whistler Film Festival

References

External links 

 
 
 
 Alan Thicke in biography.com 
 CBC Radio Q interview "Why Alan Thicke was drawn to playing a not so perfect father in his new film" December 08, 2016

1947 births
2016 deaths
20th-century Canadian male actors
21st-century Canadian male actors
Beauty pageant hosts
Burials at Santa Barbara Cemetery
Canadian expatriate male actors in the United States
Canadian game show hosts
Canadian male composers
Canadian male film actors
Canadian male television actors
Canadian male voice actors
Canadian people of Scottish descent
Canadian television talk show hosts
Deaths from aortic dissection
Ice hockey players who died while playing
Male actors from Ontario
People from Kirkland Lake
Sports deaths in California
University of Western Ontario alumni